John VII of Hoya (died 11 June 1535, fell in battle near Assens on Funen in Denmark) was a German count and army commander in the service of Lübeck and Sweden.

His parents were Count Jobst I of Hoya (1466–1507) and Irmgard of Lippe (1469–1524).

Life 
On 15 January 1525, he married Margareta Eriksdotter Vasa, the widow of Joakim Brahe (d. 1520 during the Stockholm Bloodbath), and sister of the King Gustav I of Sweden.  In 1525, he was appointed governor of Vyborg and in the same year, he renounced his rights on Hoya, in favor of his brothers, in exchange for  guilders.

In 1533, he was involved in a conspiracy against the King.  The conspiracy failed, and John VII had to flee to Tallinn.  He later returned to Germany and became the chief military commander of Lübeck.

During the Count's Feud, he fought in Denmark against Christopher of Oldenburg.  He attempted to occupy the island of Funen, however, his army was trounced at Mount Ochsenberg, near Assens, by a Danish army led by Johann Rantzau.  John VII fell in that battle, as did many other noblemen, among them Nicholas of Tecklenburg, the Burgrave of Dohna, and Gustav Trolle, the Bishop of Uppsala.

Marriage and issue 
On 15 January 1525, he married Margareta Eriksdotter Vasa (d. 31 December 1536 in Tallinn).  They had two sons:
 John (1529–1574), bishop of Osnabrück.
 Jobst, co-adjutor in Cologne.  He was captured by Franz von Halle and died in prison.

References 
 Stefan Schumacher: Das Rechtssystem im Stift Münster in der frühen Neuzeit unter Berücksichtigung der Reform des Fürstbischofs Johann von Hoya (1529–1574) von 1571, p. 8.

External links 
 Margareta Vasa

Footnotes 

Counts of Hoya
15th-century births
1535 deaths
16th-century German people
People of the Count's Feud